The Umchabezi River is a tributary of the Mzingwane River in Beitbridge District and Gwanda District, Zimbabwe. The main dam on the river is Makado Dam, which supplies water for commercial irrigation.

References 

Beitbridge District
Gwanda District
Geography of Matabeleland South Province
Mzingwane River